Watson Island State Forest is located in St. Johns County, Florida. The state forest includes 199 acres of Bottomland Forest, 129 acres of Wet Flatwoods, 124 acres of Mesic Flatwoods, 26 acres of floodplain, 23 acres of Baygall forest,  2 acres of Floodplain Marsh,  2 acres of ruderal and 1 acre of dome swamp.

See also
List of Florida state forests
List of Florida state parks

References

External links
Watson Island State Forest - Official site
Watson Island State Forest Map

Protected areas of St. Johns County, Florida
Florida state forests